The 2008 Indian Federation Cup was the 30th season of the Indian Federation Cup. It was held between 4 and 21 December 2008. The cup winner were guaranteed a place in the 2009 AFC Cup.

Results

Semi-finals
Play was halted for eight minutes during the first semi-final after Dempo's Ranti Martins collided head-on with Churchill Brothers' Ogba Kalu Nnanna in the 73rd minute, after the two rose for a corner kick from the former's teammate Robert Lalthlamuana.

Final

References

External links 
 30th Federation Cup 2008 at indianfootball.de

2008
Federation Cup
2008 domestic association football cups